The 2010 Judo Grand Prix Abu Dhabi was held in Abu Dhabi, United Arab Emirates from 22 to 24 November 2010.

Medal summary

Men's events

Women's events

Source Results

Medal table

References

External links
 

2010 IJF World Tour
2010 Judo Grand Prix
Judo
Grand Prix Abu Dhabi 2010
Judo
Judo